Saket District Centre is a commercial centre located in Saket, New Delhi.  The district centre has come up as the largest commercial and retail hub in South Delhi with numerous malls, restaurants and office buildings and plenty of parking space.

Location

The Saket District Centre is located in South Delhi, India.

Features

There are five functional malls: Select Citywalk, DLF Avenue (Formerly DLF Place), Metropolitan Mall, Southern Park, Rectangle One and Square 1 Mall.

Shopping malls

MGF Metropolitan Mall
MGF Metropolitan Mall is a shopping mall in Saket District Centre.

This mall has Shopper's Stop as anchor store along with many other retail outlets catering to the Indian Wedding Market – Sarees, Lehnengas, Ethnic India & Formal Western Wear, Fine Jewellery (6 stores), Accessories, Banquets, Restaurants & Bars, a Bose Store, Ishana Spa,  Southend Honda, Imperial Jewels and many more.

Select Citywalk
Select Citywalk is a shopping mall located in Saket District Centre. It includes retail, a multiplex, serviced apartments, offices, and public spaces. It opened in October 2007. In December 2017 it opened Delhi's first Imax theatre.

Southern Park
Southern Park is a shopping mall cum commercial complex located in Saket District Centre, just behind the Select Citywalk mall. It is home to India's largest private logistics company Gateway Rail Freight Ltd., the largest paper importer in India NTSC, and also the Chinese Visa Office. There are also numerous restaurants on the ground floor including the newly opened Carl's Jr.

DLF Avenue
DLF Avenue (Formerly DLF Place) is a fully operational shopping mall along with Select Citywalk in Saket District Centre. The mall has Debenhams and Marks & Spencer anchor stores, a retail arcade with many major Indian and international brands of clothes and apparels, a six-screen DT cinemas multiplex & diner, a food court, Hard Rock Cafe, gourmet outlets, office complex and Hilton hotel.

The South Court
The mall has a retail arcade with many major Indian brands of clothes and apparel, a food court, gourmet outlets, office complex and a hotel.

Hotels

 Hilton Garden Inn New Delhi
 Country Inn & Suites by Carlson
 Svelte Hotel & Personal Suites

External links
 http://www.selectcitywalk.com/
 Restaurant in Saket District Centre

References

 www.metropolitansaket.in

District Centres of Delhi
Neighbourhoods in Delhi